The Agony and the Ecstasy is a 1965 American historical drama film directed by Carol Reed and starring Charlton Heston as Michelangelo and Rex Harrison as Pope Julius II. The film was partly based on Irving Stone's 1961 biographical novel of the same name, and deals with the conflicts of Michelangelo and Pope Julius II during the 1508-1512 painting of the Sistine Chapel ceiling. It also features a soundtrack by prolific composers Alex North and Jerry Goldsmith.

The film was shot in Todd-AO and Cinemascope versions. The Todd-AO version was used for the DVD release because of its superior picture quality.

Plot
The film opens in documentary style, chronicling the work of Michelangelo Buonarroti.
It then follows Michelangelo, a renowned sculptor of the Republic of Florence in the early 16th century, and shows him at work on large-scale sculptures near St. Peter's Basilica. When Pope Julius II commissions him to paint the Sistine Chapel, Michelangelo resists because he finds the ceiling's paneled layout of the Twelve Apostles uninspiring. Nonetheless, he is forced into taking the job. During the initial attempt, Michelangelo is discontented with the results, and destroys the frescoes. He flees to Carrara, and then into the mountains where he finds inspiration from nature.

Michelangelo returns and is allowed to paint the entire vault in a variety of newly designed biblical scenes. The work proceeds nonstop, even with Mass in session, as months turn to years. Michelangelo's work is threatened when he collapses due to fatigue. He is nursed back to health by Contessina de' Medici, daughter of his old friend Lorenzo de' Medici. After recovering, Michelangelo returns to work after learning he is at risk of being replaced by Raphael.

Meanwhile, the Papal States are threatened during the War of the League of Cambrai. Preparing for battle and having reached the limits of his patience, the Pope terminates Michelangelo's contract. Raphael, impressed with the work in progress, asks Michelangelo to show humility and finish the ceiling. Michelangelo travels to see the injured and weakened Pope, and pleads for him to restore the patronage. Though the Pope believes an invasion of Rome is inevitable, he raises the money needed to resume work on the ceiling.

One night, Michelangelo finds the ailing Pope inspecting the portrait of God in The Creation of Adam, which the Pope declares "a proof of faith." He then collapses and becomes bedridden. Though everyone assumes that the Pope will die, Michelangelo goads him into having the will to live and to finish his work. The tide of war turns in favor of the Papal States, as allies pledge to assist the Pope.

A Mass is held in which the congregation is shown the completed ceiling. After the ceremony, Michelangelo asks to begin carving the Pope's tomb. Realizing he has a short time to live, the Pope agrees. Together, the men admire the masterpiece of the Sistine Chapel, until Pope Julius walks away and Michelangelo turns to look at the space behind the altar where he would later paint his Last Judgement.

Cast

Production
Film rights to the novel were bought by 20th Century Fox  for a reported $125,000. The head of the studio was Peter Levathes, and Burt Lancaster was linked to the film. In 1962, Fox almost collapsed due to cost over-runs on a number of films, notably Cleopatra. This resulted in Darryl F. Zanuck returning to run the studio. He installed his son Richard D. Zanuck as head of production.

In January 1963, Richard Zanuck signed Philip Dunne to write the script. In October 1963, Zanuck announced the film would be one of six "roadshow" movies the company would make over the next 12 months, worth $42 million all up. The others would be The Day Custer Fell (not made), Those Magnificent Men in Their Flying Machines, Justine, The Sound of Music and The Sand Pebbles. In November 1963, Charlton Heston signed to play the lead. Fox wanted Rex Harrison to co star and he wanted Fred Zinnemann to direct. By January, Carol Reed was set to direct and Rex Harrison to co star.

Shooting
The film's production schedule ran from June 1964 to September 1964. When it came time to film the feature, the Sistine Chapel could not be used, and it was recreated on a sound stage at Cinecittà Studios in Rome. During the production, Rex Harrison and Charlton Heston did not get along. (Reed and Heston had originally wanted Laurence Olivier for Pope Julius, but he was unavailable.) Twelve years later, while filming The Prince and the Pauper, Harrison completely avoided Heston.

According to his diary, Heston was interested in playing Michelangelo before any studios decided to produce the film. Once cast in the part, he was excited to act under Reed, who had directed The Third Man (1949). Heston felt that this would be the film to resurrect Reed's directorial reputation, describing it as having the best audience-preview responses of any film he had ever seen. However, it only did modest business at the box office.

Reception
The film grossed around $4,000,000 during its US theatrical run in 1965. It later went on to make about $8,166,000 worldwide in rentals. In September 1970 Fox estimated the film had lost the studio $5,281,000.

Bosley Crowther of The New York Times felt the film was, "not a strong and soaring drama but an illustrated lecture on a slow artist at work." He sympathized with the Pope and his mounting impatience with Michelangelo, criticizing Heston's acting as lacking any warmth to endear him to the audience. Furthermore, he believed the script suffered from being "wordy."

In a 2013 retrospective review in The Guardian, Alex von Tunzelmann noted that the film's "intent to inform is laudable, but a fictional film should really be able to convey its subject without a lecture," and echoed Crowther's observation that "the screenplay goes heavy on the dialogue, light on the action." She laments that the sex-less film fails to reveal "the real Michelangelo's passions" (particularly his reputed attraction to men), and concluded the film would have been more interesting "if it were told with a lot more humour and a lot less prudishness."

Awards
The film was nominated for five Academy Awards:
 Best Art Direction, color (John DeCuir, Jack Martin Smith, and Dario Simoni)
 Best Cinematography, color (Leon Shamroy)
 Best Costume Design, color (Vittorio Nino Novarese)
 Best Original Score (Alex North)
 Best Sound (James Corcoran)

It was nominated for two Golden Globe Awards:
Best Actor (Rex Harrison)
Best Screenplay (Philip Dunne)

It won two awards from the National Board of Review:
Best Supporting Actor (Harry Andrews)
One of the Year's 10 Best

It won the Best Foreign Film at the David di Donatello Awards.

See also
 List of American films of 1965

References

External links
 
 
 

1965 films
1960s historical films
1960s biographical films
American historical films
American biographical films
1960s English-language films
Biographical films about artists
Biographical films about painters
Films based on biographical novels
Films about Christianity
Films about Catholicism
Films about popes
Films set in Italy
Films set in the 1500s
Films set in the 1510s
Films set in Vatican City
Films directed by Carol Reed
Films with screenplays by Philip Dunne
Films scored by Jerry Goldsmith
Films scored by Alex North
Cultural depictions of Michelangelo
Cultural depictions of Raphael
Biographical films about sculptors
1960s American films